In the mathematical field of linear algebra and convex analysis, the numerical range or field of values of a complex  matrix A is the set

where  denotes the conjugate transpose of the vector . The numerical range includes, in particular, the diagonal entries of the matrix (obtained by choosing x equal to the unit vectors along the coordinate axes) and the eigenvalues of the matrix (obtained by choosing x equal to the eigenvectors).

In engineering, numerical ranges are used as a rough estimate of eigenvalues of A. Recently, generalizations of the numerical range are used to study quantum computing.

A related concept is the numerical radius, which is the largest absolute value of the numbers in the numerical range, i.e.

Properties

 The numerical range is the range of the Rayleigh quotient. 
 (Hausdorff–Toeplitz theorem) The numerical range is convex and compact.
Here  is the identity matrix.
  is a subset of the closed right half-plane if and only if  is positive semidefinite.
 The numerical range  is the only function on the set of square matrices that satisfies (2), (3) and (4).
 (Sub-additive) , where the sum on the right-hand side denotes a sumset.
 The numerical range of a  matrix is a filled ellipse.
 If  is a normal matrix then  is the convex hull of its eigenvalues.
  is a norm on the space of  matrices.
 , where  denotes the operator norm.

Generalisations 
C-numerical range
Higher-rank numerical range
Joint numerical range
Product numerical range
Polynomial numerical hull

See also
 Spectral theory
 Rayleigh quotient
 Workshop on Numerical Ranges and Numerical Radii

Bibliography
.
.
.
.
.

.
.
 "Functional Characterizations of the Field of Values and the Convex Hull of the Spectrum", Charles R. Johnson, Proceedings of the American Mathematical Society, 61(2):201-204, Dec 1976.

Matrix theory
Spectral theory
Operator theory
Linear algebra